Hans Ewald Heller (17 April 1894 – 1 October 1966) was an Austrian-American composer, music critic and teacher.

Life 
Heller studied with Camilla Horn and J. B. Foerster and received a doctorates from the University of Prague and the University of Vienna. He lived in Vienna where he worked as a music teacher and critic, editing several journals and magazines. He was an orchestrator for the Vienna Broadcasting System and taught classes on music for film. He was described in The New York Times as being the cousin of Albert Einstein.

In 1938, he moved to the United States and died in 1966.

Selected compositions

Light operas 
 Satan (Vienna, 1927)
 Messalina (Prague, 1928)
 Der Liebling von London (Vienna, 1930)

Overtures 
 Carnival in New Orleans (1940)

Cantatas 
 Ode to Our Women (1942)

References

External links
 "Heller, Hans Ewald", Oesterreichisches Musiklexikon (in German)
 "Hans Ewald Heller", italianopera.org

1894 births
1966 deaths
Composers from Vienna
Austrian male classical composers
Austrian opera composers
American male classical composers
Austrian music critics
American music critics
Classical music critics